Marguerite Archie-Hudson (born November 18, 1937) is an American politician who served in the California State Assembly from the 48th district from 1990 to 1996.

References

External links
Join California Marguerite Archie-Hudson

1937 births
Living people
Democratic Party members of the California State Assembly
African-American state legislators in California
21st-century African-American people
20th-century African-American people